Mieridduryn is a genus of extinct dinocaridid arthropod that lived during the Middle Ordovician of what is now the United Kingdom. This animal was described in 2022 based on a singular fossil found in Castle Bank, a Burgess shale type lagerstätte located in the country of Wales. This animal's taxonomic affinities are somewhat unclear, but there are some hypotheses. One is that this animal represents a new grade of Stem-euarthropods that evolved features similar to the Cambrian aged opabiniids (a family of basal arthropods). Another is that if the features seen in Mieridduryn are convergent, and not homologous, to those seen in radiodonts, then this animal represents a late surviving opabiniid (if the latter option is correct, then this means the opabiniids survived for over 40 million years longer than what was once thought).

History of research and etymology 
The one specimen of this species was found in Castle Bank, and was described in 2022. Originally, the main studies on this site focused on the Sponge fossils, but later on more studies started to focus on the arthropod section of the fauna. The fossil was collected from a quarry in private land near Llandrindod Wells. The specific quarry is a part of the larger Gilwern Volcanic Formation, and the graptolites found dated the site to the Darriwilian of the Middle Ordovician.

The sections of the genus name, mieri and duryn in Welsh means "Bramble snout". The species name Bonniae is named after Bonnie Douel, the niece of the owners of the site. The family heavily supported the research on the site after the discovery of the biota.

Description 

This animal shares a lot of features that are characteristic of dinocaridids (including tetraradial mouthparts, flapping trunk appendages, and lobopod like legs). The specimen measures around 13 mm in length on the dorsal margin of the fossil. The head of the creature bore a fused proboscis that had slender spines coming off the top, and could have also possessed a claw-like appendage. On the top of the head was a circular shaped dorsal sclerite (similar to the ones seen in radiodonts). The mouth of this animal, known as an oral cone, was 0.4 mm in length, and preserved several lightly sclerotized plates. The trunk region had two types of appendages, these being lobopod-like limbs and dorsolateral flaps. These features are important as they were at first only known from opabiniids and radiodonts, which helped support the naming of this creature as a new genus.

Classification 
Two main classifications were done on this creature, and the two found different results. One study found that this animal forms a monophyletic group with radiodonts and the deuteropods. The other, best supported study instead found this animal to be a late surviving opabiniid. The true classification of this animal however is still being debated. This does show though that the overall morphology of the opabiniids was around far longer than what was once thought.

Significance 

Before this creatures discovery, it was thought that hurdiid radiodonts (like Aegirocassis, Pseudoangustidontus and Schinderhannes) were the only dinocaridids that survived past the Cambrian. This creature shows that dinocaridids were possibly more diverse and abundant in the post-Cambrian oceans than previously thought. If this creature proves to be an opabiniid it means these creatures survived far longer into the middle Ordovician, and did not go extinct in the Cambrian.

There is actually another fossil arthropod (NMW.2021.3 G.8) known from castle bank that resembles Mieridduryn, and the opabiniids. This animal is far smaller than Mieridduryn, and has a slightly different anatomy. This animal was not named in the 2022 paper due to the enigmatic qualities of the specimen. It is thought that specimen may represent the larval stage of Mieridduryn due to the certain qualities that resemble the larval stage of other arthropods. It was also suggested, however that this specimen represents an entirely distinct genus and species due to its unique appearance.

References 

Dinocarida
Prehistoric arthropod genera
Fossil taxa described in 2022